is a Japanese instructor of Shotokan karate.
 
He is currently an instructor of the Japan Karate Association.

Biography

Yasuo Hanzaki was born in Aomori Prefecture, Japan on 12 December 1962. He studied at Taisho University. His karate training began during his 1st year of high school.

Competition
Yasuo Hanzaki has had considerable success in karate competition.

Major Tournament Success
42nd JKA All Japan Karate Championship (1999) - 3rd Place Kumite
35th JKA All Japan Karate Championship (1992) - 3rd Place Kumite
34th JKA All Japan Karate Championship (1991) - 2nd Place Kumite
33rd JKA All Japan Karate Championship (1990) - 3rd Place Kumite

References

 

1962 births
Japanese male karateka
Karate coaches
Shotokan practitioners
Sportspeople from Aomori Prefecture
Living people